Alcolea, Andalusia, Spain was the site of several historical battles:
 
Battle of Alcolea (1808)
Battle of Alcolea (1868)